Sadabad (also Romanized as Sa‘dābād; also known as Sa‘ādatābād and Sa‘īdābād) is a village in Jowshan Rural District, Golbaf District, Kerman County, Kerman Province, Iran. At the 2006 census, its population was 81, in 23 families.

References 

Populated places in Kerman County